State Route 586 (SR 586) is a north–south state highway located in the central portion of the U.S. state of Ohio.  The highway's southern terminus is at a T-intersection with SR 146 in the unincorporated community of Nashport.  The highway's northern terminus is at a Y-intersection with SR 13 in Mount Vernon.

Route description
Along its way, SR 586 travels through northwestern Muskingum County, northeastern Licking County and southeastern Knox County.  No portion of this highway is included as a component of the National Highway System, a network of routes identified as most important for the nation's economy, mobility and defense.

History
SR 586 was designated in 1939.  It was established along the routing between SR 146 in Nashport and SR 13 in Mount Vernon that it utilizes today. No changes of major significance have taken place to the highway since its designation.

Major intersections

References

586
Transportation in Muskingum County, Ohio
Transportation in Licking County, Ohio
Transportation in Knox County, Ohio